Cave digging is the practice of enlarging undiscovered cave openings to allow entry.  Cave digging usually follows a search of mountains and valleys in karst topography for new caves.  Often it takes place underground in places where a large passage has clearly been backfilled with silt, or choked with boulders.  Sometimes chisels or explosives can be used to widen constrictions in the passage when spaces are evident on the other side.

Digs are in unstable parts of a cave and often need to be shored up with scaffolding or concrete to prevent re-collapse.  It can be a dangerous activity, depending on the circumstances.

Geological cave indicators
Most of the obvious caves in countries with a well-established caving community have already been discovered and explored, so cavers must search for new caves. This is most commonly accomplished while ridgewalking, the practice of scouring the countryside, in areas with cave potential, for new, previously undiscovered openings to the underground.  These may be found in sinkholes, in rock outcrops or anywhere the ground is underlain by limestone or other soluble rock.  Areas underlain by lava flows or where lava tubes are found may also contain new caves.

If the discovered feature is either blowing or sucking air in great volumes, it is an encouraging sign and indicates that there is potential for a large or extensive cave beyond.

Technique
On occasion, a newly discovered opening will be large enough for the average person to enter, but often they are too small and must be enlarged to allow entry. When the entrance is too small, it is enlarged using cave digging techniques.

Sometimes digging simply involves moving a few rocks and some soil.  This can be accomplished with the bare hands or may involve the use of folding army shovels, root-pruning saws, small crack hammers, buckets to move the material, and rope to haul the buckets if the opening is being enlarged in a downward direction.  Large tamping tools and crowbars are also useful in dislodging the rocks and soil as the digging progresses.  

Sometimes, the use of equipment and brute force is not enough to gain entry into the cave.  In cases such as these, serious diggers resort to more complicated means of opening the cave.  Many "digs" become large group projects, involving backhoes, timber shoring, and even the use of large diameter well drilling methods.  

Where the main impediment is solid rock, entry may involve the practice of rock shaving. For shaving, holes are drilled in the rock, filled with a small amount of gunpowder, and then set off to spall the rock off in thin layers.  A similar technique, called plug and feather, involves driving wedges into lines of small diameter holes that have been drilled in the rock.  As the wedges are driven into the holes, a crack forms along the line of holes and the rock is eventually broken. A more recently developed technique is known as "capping", where a hole is drilled into the rock using a battery-powered drill, a small charge (commonly designed for use with a nail gun) is inserted, and tapped with a long steel rod in order to cleave off pieces of rock. An environmental and safety assessment should be conducted before blasting to ensure minimal impact to the cave environment.

References

Caving